Tanja  Michaela Karin Liedtke (6 October 1977 – 17 August 2007) was a German-born professional choreographer and dancer.  She was most noted as a dancer, choreographer and director of contemporary dance in Australia and Europe.

Early life and education 

Tanja  Michaela Karin Liedtke was born on 6 October 1977 in Stuttgart, West Germany.  As a young child, she moved with her family to Madrid, Spain, where she began to study ballet.  Her family then settled in London, England, where she won a place to study at the Elmhurst School for Dance. 

After deciding to pursue a career in contemporary dance, she continued her studies at the Rambert School in London, graduating in 1995.

Career 
Liedtke was granted Australian citizenship in 1996, keeping the dual German and Australian citizenship, and began her professional career with Australian Dance Theatre, working with the company until 2003.  During this time, she toured with the company internationally, most notably around Australia, Asia, United Kingdom and North America.  After ADT, she returned to England, where she joined the London-based DV8 Physical Theatre, under the direction of choreographer Lloyd Newson.  During 2001 to 2007 Liedtke started to choreograph her own work. In 2007, Liedtke was appointed artistic director of the Sydney Dance Company, succeeding the founder Graeme Murphy.  Unfortunately she did not have the opportunity to take the position, as she was killed in an accident before she was due to start.

Legacy 
The Tanja Liedtke Foundation was established in May 2008 in honour of her work. The foundation's purpose is to support the enrichment and advancement of contemporary dance theatre, and the development of Australian/European artistic connections.

The Tanja Liedtke Foundation is registered in Stuttgart, Germany, as Tanja Liedtke Stiftung, with tax-privileged purposes in accordance with German Law.

The film Life in Movement directed by Bryan Mason and Sophie Hyde from Adelaide film company Closer Productions about her was named best work at the 2011 Ruby Awards for the arts. It also won the 2011 Foxtel Australian Documentary Prize and won AACTA nominations for direction and for best feature documentary.

In 2023, Australian Dance Theatre (ADT) in Adelaide partnered with the Tanja Liedtke Foundation to offer four four Tanja Liedtke Studio creative residencies at the Odeon Theatre, Norwood, the home of ADT.

Awards 
1999 - Dance Australia Critics Choice Award for Most Promising Choreography
2000 - Dance Australia Critics Choice Award for Most Promising Choreography
2006 - Australian Dance Award for Outstanding Achievement in Choreography for her production of Twelfth Floor
2008 - Helpmann Award for Best Choreography in a Dance or Physical Theatre Work for her choreography of "Construct" (posthumous)
2009 - Australian Dance Award for Outstanding Achievement in Choreography for her choreography of Construct (posthumous)
2009 - Australian Dance Award for Outstanding Achievement in Independent Dance for her choreography of Construct (posthumous)

See also 
The Cost of Living (2004 film)

References

External links

Tanja Liedtke Archive

Papers of Tanya Liedke at the National Library of Australia

1977 births
2007 deaths
Road incident deaths in Australia
Australian choreographers
German choreographers
Accidental deaths in New South Wales
People educated at the Elmhurst School for Dance
Helpmann Award winners